P. Paulose Thankachan (born 29 July 1939, at Angamali in Ernakulam District) is an Indian politician 
who belongs to the Indian National Congress party. He was elected to the Kerala Legislative Assembly in 1982 and also in the subsequent Assemblies of 1987, 1991 and 1996, all from Perumbavoor.

Personal life
P.P. Thankachan was born on July 29, 1939, at Angamali in the Ernakulam District, as the son of the Rev. Father Paulose.

Political positions held
Opposition Chief Whip (1987–91)
Minister for Agriculture from 3 May 1995 to 9 May 1996.
President, KPCC (2004)
Chair of Speaker of Assembly in the 9th Kerala Legislative Assembly from 1 July 1991 to 3 May 1995

References

Kerala MLAs 1982–1987
Indian National Congress politicians from Kerala
Politicians from Kochi
1939 births
Living people
Speakers of the Kerala Legislative Assembly